Cyclops Nuclear Submarine Captain is the second studio album by Dogbowl, released in 1991 by Shimmy Disc.

Track listing

Personnel 
Adapted from Cyclops Nuclear Submarine Captain liner notes.

 Dogbowl – lead vocals, guitar
Musicians
 Daryl Dragon – guitar, additional vocals
 Raceage – drums, percussion, additional vocals
 Michael J. Schumacher – drums, guitar
 Lee Ming Tah – bass guitar, additional vocals
 Chris Tunney – clarinet, saxophone, organ, additional vocals

Production and additional personnel
 Kramer – production, engineering, organ, additional vocals
 Michael Macioce – photography
 Ron Paul – assistant engineer

Release history

References

External links 
 

1991 albums
Albums produced by Kramer (musician)
Dogbowl albums
Shimmy Disc albums